In enzymology, a 2'-deoxymugineic-acid 2'-dioxygenase is an enzyme that catalyzes the chemical reaction

2'-deoxymugineic acid + 2-oxoglutarate + O2  mugineic acid + succinate + CO2

The 3 substrates of this enzyme are 2'-deoxymugineic acid, 2-oxoglutarate, and O2, whereas its 3 products are mugineic acid, (a compound related to azetidine-2-carboxylic acid) succinate, and CO2.

This enzyme belongs to the family of oxidoreductases, specifically those acting on paired donors, with O2 as oxidant and incorporation or reduction of oxygen. The oxygen incorporated need not be derived from O2 with 2-oxoglutarate as one donor, and incorporation of one atom o oxygen into each donor.  The systematic name of this enzyme class is 2'-deoxymugineic acid,2-oxoglutarate:oxygen oxidoreductase (2-hydroxylating). This enzyme is also called IDS3.

References

 
 

EC 1.14.11
Enzymes of unknown structure